Gordon Giltrap is an English guitarist and composer. His discography consists of 22 studio albums, 7 live albums, 15 compilations, 2 videos, 1 EP, and 11 singles.

Studio albums
 1968: Gordon Giltrap (Transatlantic Records) - later reissued on cassette as The Early Days (Allegro ALC) with a different track sequence
 1969: Portrait (Transatlantic)
 1971: A Testament of Time (MCA Records)
 1973: Giltrap (Philips Records)
 1976: Visionary (The Electric Record Company, catalogue no. TRIX 2)
 1977: Perilous Journey (The Electric Record Company, catalogue no. TRIX 4)
 1978: Fear of the Dark (The Electric Record Company)
 1979: The Peacock Party (PVK)
 1982: Airwaves (PVK)
 1984: In At The Deep End (KPM)
 1987: Elegy (Filmtrax) - reissued in 2000 by La Cooka Ratcha
 1987: A Midnight Clear (Modern Music) - a collection of Christmas carols
 1995: Music for the Small Screen (Munchkin)
 1998: Troubadour (K-tel)
 1998: Down the River (K-tel)
 2002: Under This Blue Sky (La Cooka Ratcha)
 2003: Remember This (La Cooka Ratcha) - primarily cover songs
 2004: Drifter (La Cooka Ratcha)
 2007: Secret Valentine (La Cooka Ratcha / Voiceprint)
 2010: Shining Morn (Floating World)

Cassette-only releases
 1991: The Eye of the Wind (Heartsongs) - Giltrap composition performed by The Birmingham Schools Concert Orchestra
 1995: The Brotherhood Suite (Munchkin) - with the Nottinghamshire Education String Orchestra at the Albert Hall

Live albums
 1981. Live (Cube Records) - at Oxford Polytechnic on 9 March 1979 - reissued in 2000 on La Cooka Ratcha as Live at Oxford
 1992: On a Summer's Night (Music Maker) - live Aug. 1991 at the Warwick Festival.
 1995: Live at the BBC (BBC Worldwide)
 2003: The Gordon Giltrap Band Live 1981 (La Cooka Ratcha) 
 2003: Fingers Of Fire (ARC)
 2006: Captured From a Point in Time (Hypertension) - a reissue of 2003 Fingers of Fire with bonus track "The Dodo's Dream"
 2004: Live at Ambergate (La Cooka Ratcha / Voiceprint) - live 20-22 August 2002 in Shining Cliff Woods, Ambergate, Derbyshire - a binaural recording
 2004: The River Sessions (River Records) - recorded by Radio Clyde on 29th November 1979 at the Magnum theatre, Irvine
 2006: Gordon Giltrap And Friends At The Symphony Hall Birmingham (La Cooka Ratcha)
 2009: As It Happens... (Voiceprint) - live January 2007 at Dorchester Arts Centre

Compilations
 1980: Performance (K-tel) - includes "Theme From The Waltons" which was released as a single
 1981: Platinum Collection (Cube)
 1990: Guitarist (Music Maker)
 1991: The Best Of Gordon Giltrap (Prestige)
 1992: The Solo Album (Resurgent Music) released in 2000 - solo acoustic performance collection
 1993: Gordon Giltrap / Portrait (Transatlantic) - compilation of two albums 
 2000: Part of the Picture (Snapper Music)
 2001: Collection (La Cooka Ratcha) contains some rare and previously unreleased music, as well as music from previous albums
 2001: Acoustic Troubadour (La Cooka Ratcha) - reissue of Troubadour with extra disc containing guitar-only versions of the original songs
 2007: Sixty Minutes With Gordon Giltrap (Voiceprint Records)
 2010: The Peacock Party & Airwaves ... Plus (Edsel) - compilation of two albums and five bonus live cuts
 2010: Music For The Small Screen / The Solo Album (Edsel) - compilation of two albums 
 2010: Remember This/Janschology - compilation of two albums
 2010: Troubadour / Live At The Ventnor Winter Gardens (Edsel) - compilation of Troubadour with bonus tracks and a DVD of a May 2008 concert
 2015: Time To Reflect: A Personal Anthology (Trapeze)

Library albums
 1979: Guitar masterclass, Compositions for solo and accompanied guitar written and performed by leading exponents (KPM 1237) - 6 out of 24 tracks by Gordon Giltrap (the others are by Richard Harvey, Graeme Taylor and Kevin Peek)
 1981: Airwaves (Themes TIM 1038) - 16 tracks by Gordon Giltrap Band (Side A: Contemporary rock guitar, Side B: Featured acoustic guitar)
 1984: In At The Deep End, The distinctive style of Gordon Giltrap and the Gordon Giltrap Band (KPM 1330) - 19 tracks by Gordon Giltrap and the Gordon Giltrap Band

EPs
 2000: Janschology EP (Resurgent) - tribute to Bert Jansch

Singles
 1977: "Lucifer's Cage" / "The Echoing Green" (The Electric Record Company)
 1977: "Heartsong" / "The Deserter" (The Electric Record Company)
 1978: "Oh Well" / "Reflections And Despair" (The Electric Record Company)
 1978-11: "Weary Eyes" / "Nightrider" (The Electric Record Company)
 1978: "Fear Of The Dark (edited version)" / "Melancholy Lullaby" (The Electric Record Company)
 1979: "Fear Of The Dark" / "Inner Dream (live)" (The Electric Record Company)
 1979: "Fear Of The Dark (edited version)" / "Catwalk blues" (live) & "Inner Dream" (live) (12", The Electric Record Company, LWOT29)
 1979: "Fear Of The Dark (edited version)" / "Catwalk blues" (live) & "Inner Dream" (live) (12", Picture Disc, The Electric Record Company, LWOP29)
 1979: "O Jerusalem" / "Party Piece" (The Electric Record Company)
 1981: "Hocus Pocus" / "Dodo's Dream" (PVK)
 1981: "Chi Mai" (with Juan Martin) / "After the Storm" (Juan Martin only) (PVK)
 1982: "Sunburst" / "Headwind" (PVK)
 1988: "Coppers Will Turn Into Silver" / "In The Bleak Midwinter" (The Birmingham Mail) with Malcolm Stent

Video
 2011: Double Vision in Vision DVD (Floating World) with Raymond Burley - filmed live in 2006 at Stickford Church and Fulston Manor
 2013: Live at Huntingdon Hall DVD (Wienerworld) - Live performances and extra material

Music Books
 1991: Gordon Giltrap, A Special Collection book (International Music Publications) 
 2003: Classic Giltrap book (Registry Publications) , 9781898466499 - five compositions by Giltrap arranged for classical guitar by Raymond Burley
 2005: Total Giltrap: Guitar Encounters of the Fingerstyle Kind book + CD (Mel Bay) 

As a member of Accolade
 1970: Accolade (Capitol Records)

Collaborations
With Joan Armatrading
 1976: Stereo Pop Special-135 (BBC Transcription Services) - live 13 November 1976 at the Paris Theatre, London

With Raymond Burley
 2009: Double Visions (Floating World)

With Martin Green and Carol Lee Sampson
 2011 Echoes of Heaven (K-tel)

With Ric Sanders
 1989: One to One (Nico Polo)

With Martin Taylor
 1991: A Matter of Time (Prestige) reissued with extra songs in 2005 on P-3 as Giltrap and Taylor.
 2012: Best of the Essential Years: Gordon Giltrap & Martin Taylor (Xelon Entertainment)

With Rick Wakeman
 2009: From Brush and Stone (Gonzo)

With Oliver Wakeman
 2013: Ravens & Lullabies (Esoteric Recordings)

With Paul Ward
 2017: The Last Of England (Psychotron)

With The Sheffield Philharmonic Orchestra
 2005: Giltrap (self-released) - live 30 March 2005 at Symphony Hall, Birmingham and 30-31 July 2004 at St. Paul's Hall, University of Huddersfield

As composer
 1971: Accolade - Accolade 2 (Regal Zonophone) - track 9, "William Taplin"

Appears on
 1969: Pauline Filby - Show Me A Rainbow (Herald Records)
 1972: Graham Kendrick - Footsteps On The Sea (Key) - acoustic guitar
 1973: Dave Ellis - Album (Sonet) - second guitarist on track 8, "Something wrong"  
 1973: Larry Norman - Only Visiting This Planet (Verve Records) - guitar on track 2, "The Outlaw"
 1979: Nutshell - Believe It Or Not (Myrrh Records) - guitar on track 10, "Thief In The Night"
 1980: Adrian Snell with The Royal Philharmonic Orchestra - The Passion (Kingsway) - acoustic guitar
 2015: Merry Hell - The Ghost in our House And Other Stories... (Mrs Casey) - guitar on track 2, "Leave a Light On"
 2017: Bert Jansch On the Edge of a Dream (Earth) - guitar on track 4-8, "Chambertin"
 2017: John Shuttleworth - The A1111 And Other Ones! (Free Range Product) - guitar on track 2-13, "Sutton On Sea"

Individual songs on compilation albums by various artists
 1968: Various Artists - Listen Here! (A Transatlantic Records sampler) - Contains "In love with a stranger" by Gordon Giltrap
 1997: Various Artists - The Sky Goes All The Way Home (A Down's Syndrome Fundraising Compilation, Voiceprint) - Contains "Fell runner" by Gordon Giltrap 
 1998: Various Artists - Total Guitar CD vol. 44 (Accompanying CD to music magazine Total Guitar'') - Contains "Quest for Nonsuch" by Gordon Giltrap

References

External links
 
 
 

Discographies of British artists
Folk music discographies